Savoy is an unincorporated community in Lauderdale County, Mississippi, United States. Its ZIP code is 39307.

History 
Located seven miles southwest of Meridian, Mississippi, Savoy was first established sometime in 1883 under the name of Corrine as a right of way on the New Orleans and Northeastern Railroad. In 1896, the name was shortened to Corry, and finally to Savoy in 1903. The railroad had a passing siding and house track here at one point. A post office was established here in 1900 before being abolished in 1913.

Notes 

Unincorporated communities in Lauderdale County, Mississippi
Unincorporated communities in Mississippi